James Venable may refer to:

James L. Venable (20th and 21st century), American composer
James R. Venable (1901-1993), American white supremacist